Hong Kong FA Cup is a knockout cup competition in Hong Kong football, run by and named after The Hong Kong Football Association. The first edition of the competition was held in 1975, before then the cup was known as the Golden Jubilee Cup. The current season is the 45th edition of the event. 14 different teams have won the cup with 10-time champions South China being the most successful.

In the first three years, the semi-finals and the finals were two-legged events. If the aggregate result was drawn, there would be extra time after the second leg. Drawn ties after extra time would be settled by a replay. However, this practice was abandoned in 1977. Since 1978, all matches have become one-legged, draws are settled by extra time and penalty shootouts.

Moreover, teams from the First Division, Second Division and Third Division were allowed to enter the competition before through qualifying from the preliminary round. However, due to the huge difference in playing level between the Premier League and the lower levels below it, the cup has been limited to top-flight teams since the 2016–17 season. The teams in the lower divisions are now competing in the FA Cup Junior Division.

The current FA Cup holders are Eastern.

Competition name due to sponsorship

Finals

Key

Results

Notes

Results by team
Teams shown in italics are no longer in existence.

See also
The Hong Kong Football Association
Hong Kong FA Cup Junior Division
Hong Kong Premier League
Hong Kong First Division League
Hong Kong Second Division League
Hong Kong Third Division League
Hong Kong Senior Challenge Shield
Hong Kong Sapling Cup

References

External links
FA Cup, The Hong Kong Football Association website.
Hong Kong Football
Hong Kong – List of FA Cup Winners at the RSSSF

 
Football cup competitions in Hong Kong